Oshakan or Oshagan (} is a surname. Notable people with the surname include:

Hagop Oshagan (1883–1948), Armenian literary figure
Vahé Oshagan (1922–2000), Armenian literary figure

Armenian-language surnames